Jonke is a German surname. Etymologically, it is a diminutive of the name Johann 'John'. Variations of the surname Jonke include Jonker, Yonke, and Yonker. It appears in Germany, Austria, and other German-language territories, as well in Slovenia, where the surname appeared among Gottschee Germans. The surname may refer to:

 Frank Jonke (born 1985), Canadian soccer player
 Georg Jonke (1777–1864), Carniolan priest and beekeeper
 Gert Jonke (1946–2009), Austrian poet, playwright and novelist
 John Jonke (born 1987), Canadian soccer player
 Ljudevit Jonke (1907–1979), Croatian linguist

References 

German-language surnames